Joseph Kohnen (25 October 1940 in Luxembourg City – 2 March 2015) was a writer from Luxembourg. He won the Servais Prize in 1995. He was also a teacher at Athénée de Luxembourg.

References

Biography at the CNL (in Luxembourgish)

1940 births
2015 deaths
Luxembourgian writers
People from Luxembourg City
Members of the European Academy of Sciences and Arts
Alumni of the Athénée de Luxembourg